Thomas "Themis" Khatzis (born 23 July 1972) is a Greek former water polo player who competed in the 1996 Summer Olympics (6th place) and the 2000 Summer Olympics (10th place) with the Greece men's national water polo team.

Khatzis started his career at Poseidon Ilision and in 1992 he moved to Olympiacos where he played for twelve consecutive seasons (1992–2004), winning 20 major titles (1 LEN Euroleague, 1 LEN Supercup, 9 Greek Championships, 7 Greek Cups and 2 Greek Supercups).

Khatzis was a key player in Olympiacos' 2002 Quardruple (LEN Champions League, LEN Super Cup, Greek Championship, Greek Cup all in 2002), scoring 2 goals in the 2002 LEN Champions League final win (9–7) against Honvéd in Budapest. He was the captain of Olympiacos in the 2002 LEN Super Cup win against Vasas (6–5) in Budapest.

Honours

Club
Olympiacos
 LEN Euroleague (1): 2001–02
 LEN Super Cup (1): 2002
 Greek Championship (9): 1992–93, 1994–95, 1995–96, 1998–99, 1999–00, 2000–01, 2001–02, 2002–03, 2003–04
 Greek Cup (7): 1992–93, 1996–97, 1997–98, 2000–01, 2001–02, 2002–03, 2003–04
 Greek Super Cup (2): 1997, 1998

National team
 6th place in 1996 Olympic Games, Atlanta

References

1972 births
Living people
Greek male water polo players
Olympiacos Water Polo Club players
Olympic water polo players of Greece
Water polo players at the 1996 Summer Olympics
Water polo players at the 2000 Summer Olympics

Ethnikos Piraeus Water Polo Club players